James Condia Jones (born April 20, 1964) is an American professional baseball coach, and former pitcher. Jones is the pitching coach for the Amarillo Sod Poodles, the Double-A minor league baseball affiliate of the San Diego Padres.

Playing career
Jones was selected in the first round (third overall) of the 1982 Major League Baseball draft by the Padres out of Thomas Jefferson High School in Dallas, Texas. While in high school Jones had gained national attention for striking out 28 batters in a 16-inning play-off game while throwing 251 pitches. Jones claimed in a 2004 interview that his arm was so sore two days after the marathon effort that he could not throw a baseball from third base to first base.

Jones threw a one-hit shutout against the first-place Houston Astros in his big league debut on September 21, 1986. He was the first pitcher to throw a one-hitter in his debut game since Billy Rohr in 1967.

Coaching
Jones served as the interim bullpen coach for the San Diego Padres for part of the 2012 season, following the death of Darrel Akerfelds. He was replaced by Willie Blair in December 2012.

Jones served the pitching coach for the Peoria Padres of the Arizona League, as well as the for the San Antonio Missions of the Texas League.

References

External links

1964 births
Living people
American expatriate baseball players in Canada
American expatriate baseball players in Japan
Baseball coaches from Texas
Baseball players from Dallas
Beaumont Golden Gators players
Columbus Clippers players
Houston Astros players
Jackson Generals (Texas League) players
Las Vegas Stars (baseball) players
Major League Baseball pitchers
Minor league baseball coaches
Montreal Expos players
New York Yankees players
Nippon Professional Baseball pitchers
Ottawa Lynx players
Reno Padres players
San Diego Padres players
Thomas Jefferson High School (Dallas) alumni
Walla Walla Padres players
Yomiuri Giants players